The River Alyn is a tributary of the River Dee, in north-east Wales. The River Alyn rises at the southern end of the Clwydian hills and the Alyn Valley forms part of the Clwydian Range and Dee Valley Area of Outstanding Natural Beauty. The main town on the river is Mold, the county town of Flintshire. It lends its name to the constituencies of Alyn and Deeside in the UK Parliament and the Senedd.

The River Alyn crosses the carboniferous limestone from Halkyn Mountain and north through the Loggerheads area before heading southeast, passing through Mold before reaching its confluence with the River Dee to the northeast of Wrexham.

Between Loggerheads and Rhydymwyn it runs through the Alyn Gorge, which is the site of the caves Ogof Hesp Alyn, Ogof Hen Ffynhonnau and Ogof Nadolig. The river mainly runs across a limestone surface, creating potholes and underwater caves, into which the river flows through some of the summer, when water levels have decreased significantly. For parts of this stretch the river bed is dry for most of the year.

Flows in the River Alyn are significantly affected by mining, particularly the Milwr mine drainage tunnel which diverts a sizeable amount (23 million gallons of water per day.) of the River Alyn out of its catchment and into the estuary of the River Dee at Bagillt.

References

External links
 The River Alyn
 Google maps confluence with River Dee
www.geograph.co.uk : photos of the River Alyn and surrounding areas

Alyn
Alyn
1Alyn
Rivers of Wrexham County Borough